Mina Helen Hadjian (born 1975) is a Norwegian-Iranian talk-show host and radio personality. Although widely successful, her shows were known for raising controversial topics, and her and work-ethics has been widely debated.

Early life and education
Born in Teheran, Hadjian fled Iran with her family in 1979 after the islamic revolution, and was raised first in London and later in Norway when her family settled on Kråkerøy in Fredrikstad. She has studied market economics at the BI Norwegian Business School in Oslo and Marketing Communications, French and Italian at the University of Greenwich in London.

Radio career
Starting out as a producer / director at MTV Europe in London. She has also worked with the French news network Channel 24 as well as Norwegian radio station NRJ.
Hadjian made her television debut on Monday 16 April 2007 with the show Unseen: Mina. The program got the lowest possible rating of 1 by newspaper VG, and the online edition VG.nett wrote 17 April 2007 that Mina would "tattoo the 1-rating on her backside," in an attempt to copy Ari Behn s alleged tattoo of 6-rating (the best) on his shoulder. She hosted the controversial Radio show called "Mina" on NRK P3 until 2007 when she was sacked following a string of controversies. During the autumn of 2008 she launched her new website-based venture, in which she would act as both radio-host and blogger. It consisted of weekly broadcasts where she interviewed celebrities. Hadjian was also a host on the television talk show Studio 5, which aired on the channel FEM from 2008 to 2010.

Controversies
In November 2006, a commercial was made for her show on NRK in which she stated, "Hi, this is Veronica Orderud, and I listen to Mina every day. If you do not do the same, I will kill you." Orderud was convicted of a notorious triple-murder in 2000, and the ad was considered to be vulgar and tasteless.

In March 2007, she interviewed designer and artist Marianne Aulie live, and during the broadcast Aulie named two high-profile celebrities as alleged sex-offenders. The interview with Aulie left Hadjian so moved that she shed tears during the broadcast. The reaction to the interview was immediate, Jahn Otto Johansen at the NRK and other celebrities responded negatively and Johansen said, "She's destroying NRK." NRK P3 producer Tone Donald defended Hadjian and stated that "She runs with real-time radio, where she explains how she feels, like today. I wish that Mina can continue to express her feelings."

On 17 October 2007 it became clear that she had been sacked by the NRK P3. The background for this was that during the airing of her talk-show "Mina" the staff experienced technical difficulties. Hadjian responded by profanely scolding her staff and her producers live on air. The network subsequently cancelled all her remaining shows, and filled the air-time with a "Night-temp". Shortly after the network announced publicly that her contract had been terminated.

References

1975 births
Living people
People from Tehran
Refugees in Norway
Iranian emigrants to Norway
Norwegian entertainers
Alumni of the University of Greenwich
BI Norwegian Business School alumni
NRK people
Norwegian television presenters
Norwegian radio personalities